Arngrim was a berserker, who features in Hervarar saga, Gesta Danorum, Lay of Hyndla, a number of Faroese ballads and Orvar-Odd's saga in Norse mythology.

Hervarar saga
According to versions H and U, Arngrim went pillaging to Gardariki and met its king Svafrlami, who was in possession of Tyrfing at the moment. Tyrfing cut through Arngrim's shield and down into the soil, whereupon Arngrim cut off Svafrlami's hand, grabbed the sword and slew him with his own weapon. Then Arngrim captured Svafrlami's daughter Eyfura and forced her to marry him.

Version R, however relates that Arngrim became Sigrlami's war-chief and won many battles and conquered land and subjects for the old king. In recompense, Arngrim was given a high position in the realm, Eyfura and Tyrfing.

In all versions of the saga, Arngrim returned to Bolmsö with Eyfura (although versions H and U say that it was the island Bolm in Hålogaland). They had twelve sons who all followed in their father's footsteps and became berserkers. According to the U version, they were called Angantyr, Hjörvard, Hervard, Hrani, Barri, Tyrfing, Tind, two Haddings, Bui, Bild and Toki. According to the H version, their names were Angantyr, Hjorvard, Hervard, Hrani, Brami, Barri, Reifnir, Tind, Saeming and Bui and the two Haddings (in version R only six are mentioned: Angantyr, Hjörvard, Hervard, Hrani and the two Haddings).

For the continued adventures of the sword Tyrfing, see Angantyr and Hjalmar.

Gesta Danorum
According to Saxo Grammaticus, Arngrim was a Swedish champion who had killed Skalk the Scanian. This made him very proud of himself and he consequently ventured to ask for the hand of Eyfura, the daughter of Frodi, a Danish king.

However, when Frodi denied his request, Arngrim turned to Erik, the King of Sweden, and asked him for advice. Erik told Arngrim to earn Frodi's respect by killing Egther, the king of Bjarmaland and Thengil, the king of Finnmark. Arngrim first attacked Thengil and crushed the Saami. As the Saami fled they threw three pebbles behind them that they enchanted so that the pebbles looked like three mountains. As Arngrim was tricked he called back his men. The next day, they again started to chase the Saami, but the Saami threw snow on the ground and made it look like a river, and this made the Swedes stop the pursuit. The third day, the battle recommenced and this time the Saami had no more magic to resort to, and they were defeated. The Saami agreed to the peace terms, and every third year every Saami was forced to pay a full carriage of reindeer hides.

Then Arngrim took on Egther of Bjarmaland and slew him in single combat. He then forced the Bjarmians to pay him one hide each. Arngrim returned to Erik, who accompanied Arngrim to Frodi. Erik convinced Frodi that Arngrim was the best possible match for Frodi's daughter Eyfura. Frodi agreed to the marriage and by Eyfura Arngrim had twelve sons.

Saxo Grammaticus agrees with Hervarar saga by giving the same names for nine of the twelve sons: Angantyr, Hjörvard, Hervard, Hrani, Biarbe, Tyrfing, Tand, two Haddings, Brand, Brodd and Hiarrande.

Lay of Hyndla
The lay of Hyndla also mentions Arngrim and Eyfura, but only relates that they lived on Bolmsö and that they had as sons twelve ravaging berserkers named Hervard, Hjorvard, Rane, Angantyr, Bue, Brame, Barre, Reivner, Tind, Tyrving and two Haddings.

Arngrim's sons
It appears that Lay of Hyndla preserves the original list.

Ballads
A medieval ballad collected in Telemark (The restless men) relates to the "sons of Arngrim" in the refrain: "Those sons of Arngrim of the north pray for homeward passage".

References

External links
The Danish historian Saxo Grammaticus on Arngrim

Tyrfing cycle
Heroes in Norse myths and legends